Niranjan Iyengar born in Dombivali, Maharashtra, India, is a screenwriter and lyricist particularly known for his work with director Karan Johar. He is also author of the book, The Making of Kabhi Khushi Kabhie Gham.... Niranjan also hosts the talk show Look Who's Talking with Niranjan, which is aired on Zee Café.

Selected filmography

Awards and nominations
Star Screen Awards
Nominated: Best Dialogue – Kal Ho Naa Ho (2004)

Zee Cine Awards
Nominated: Best Dialogue – Kal Ho Naa Ho (2004)

Filmfare Awards
Nominated: Best Lyricist – "Sajda" and "Noor-e-Khuda" from My Name Is Khan (2011)

Mirchi Music Awards
Nominated: Album of The Year – My Name is Khan (2010)
Nominated: Lyricist of The Year – "Sajdaa" from My Name is Khan (2010)
Nominated: Lyricist of The Year – "Tere Naina" from My Name is Khan (2010)

References

External links 

Indian male screenwriters
Living people
Year of birth missing (living people)
Hindi screenwriters